Stick Stickly is a fictional character created by Agi Fodor and Karen Kuflik, and appearing on Nickelodeon. He is a popsicle stick with googly eyes, a jelly bean nose, and a small mouth.

He was the host of Nick in the Afternoon, a programming block on the network that aired summers from 1994 to 1998 on weekday afternoons. Stickly would often be subject to U-Dip, where viewers pick which substance he is dipped in.

After more than a dozen years off the air, Stickly was next seen in various promos for the TeenNick programming block The '90s Are All That90s are all that with Stick Stickly!, including the music video for the block's anthem. On September 6, 2011, an ad aired announcing that Stick would be returning to television on Friday October 7, 2011 at midnight. The following week, it was announced via a separate ad that he would host every Friday for the block's version of U-Pick. On his debut night, it became apparent that his segments were adapted for his new target demographic, both in terms of more mature language and humor and in terms of modern technology.

For New Year's Eve 2011/12, he was joined by correspondents Woodknot and Face. Stickly's appearances were placed on hiatus in March 2012. He temporarily returned to host 1990s Game Show Week on August 5, 2013, then returned to U-Pick on a regular weekly basis in June 2015.

On February 8, 2016, TeenNick's block The Splat, had a "U-Pick" week, where Twitter users could ask to play certain shows using the hashtag, #UPickTheSplat. The whole event was hosted by Stick Stickly and featured classic Nick in the Afternoon "U-Dip" segments during commercial breaks.

Stickly is voiced by Paul Christie, who also voiced Noggin's mascot Moose A. Moose.

Theme song address: Stick Stickley P.O Box 963 New York City New York State 10108

References

Television characters introduced in 1994
Fictional characters from New York City
Puppets